Gerhard "Gerd" Winkler (born 17 January 1951 in Langewiese) is a German former biathlete who competed in the 1976 Winter Olympics and in the 1980 Winter Olympics.

References

1951 births
Living people
German male biathletes
Olympic biathletes of West Germany
Biathletes at the 1976 Winter Olympics
Biathletes at the 1980 Winter Olympics
Olympic bronze medalists for West Germany
Olympic medalists in biathlon
Biathlon World Championships medalists
Medalists at the 1980 Winter Olympics